Dr. Feelgood are an English pub rock band from Canvey Island, Essex. Formed in January 1971, the group originally consisted of lead vocalist, harmonicist and slide guitarist Lee Brilleaux (real name Lee Collinson), lead guitarist and second vocalist Wilko Johnson (real name John Wilkinson), bassist John B. "Sparko" Sparks, pianist John Potter and drummer Terry "Bandsman" Howarth. The group's current lineup features drummer Kevin Morris (since 1983), bassist and guitarist Phil H. Mitchell (from 1983 to 1991, and since 1995), lead guitarist Gordon Russell (Gordon Russell (1983-1989 and since 2021), and lead vocalist and harmonicist Robert Kane (since 1999).

History

1971–1983
Brilleaux, Johnson, Sparks, Potter and Howarth formed Dr. Feelgood in January 1971, although by April both Potter and Howarth had left, with John "The Big Figure" Martin taking over on drums. This lineup released three studio albums and one live collection, before Johnson left on 2 April 1977 due to tensions with other members of the band. Before a full-time replacement was found, the group performed a handful of shows with substitute guitarist Henry McCullough and keyboardist Tim Hinkley. By the end of the month, Johnson had been replaced on a permanent basis by John Mayo, who was later nicknamed "Gypie" by Brilleaux after he told the guitarist that he "always had the gyp". Sneakin' Suspicion, the last album to feature Johnson, was released after the change in personnel.

After spending nearly four years in the band, Mayo left Dr. Feelgood in early 1981 and was replaced by Johnny "Guitar" Crippen of the Count Bishops in June. Just one release followed, Fast Women and Slow Horses, after which the group suffered a major setback when the long-standing rhythm section of Sparks and Martin left in April 1982. Brilleaux and Crippen completed a pre-booked European tour with stand-in bassist Pat McMullen and drummer Buzz Barwell, before disbanding the group at the end of the year. Just three months later, however, Brilleaux – persuaded by band manager Chris Fenwick – relaunched Dr. Feelgood with new lead guitarist Gordon Russell (who had auditioned for Mayo's vacated role two years earlier), bassist Phil H. Mitchell and, later, drummer Kevin Morris.

1983 onwards
The lineup of Brilleaux, Russell, Mitchell and Morris released four studio albums between 1984 and 1987. However, after touring for the first three months of 1989, Russell took a temporary leave of absence from the band when his infant daughter died of cot death syndrome. Former guitarist Gypie Mayo returned for a string of dates as the band continued their European tour, before Russell left permanently after a short French run in May and Steve Walwyn joined in his place. In 1991, during the recording of the band's first album in four years, Primo, Mitchell left Dr. Feelgood; the recordings were completed by temporary fill-in Ben Connelly and later Dave Bronze. Craig Rhind took over for the subsequent touring cycle when Bronze was unavailable due to commitments with Procol Harum.

During the recording of The Feelgood Factor in 1993, frontman Brilleaux was diagnosed with Hodgkin lymphoma. The band ceased touring as a result, but performed a final pair of shows on 24 and 25 January 1994 at their own Dr. Feelgood Music Bar in Canvey Island, which was recorded for the live album Down at the Doctors. Ian Gibbons performed keyboards at the shows. Just over two months later, on 7 April 1994, Brilleaux died of his illness at the age of 41. Following the death of their frontman, Dr. Feelgood disbanded, before returning in June 1995 with new frontman Pete Gage joining returning members Walwyn, Mitchell and Morris. Live album On the Road Again was issued in 1996, Gage left in August 1999 and former Animals II frontman Robert Kane took his place.

On 16 June 2021, it was announced that Walwyn was "unavailable to play live shows for the foreseeable future". Later concerts were played by former guitarist Gordon Russell, whom Walwyn had replaced 32 years before.

Members

Current

Former

Touring

Timeline

Lineups

References

External links
Dr. Feelgood official website

Dr. Feelgood